Ueda Station is the name of multiple train stations in Japan:

 Ueda Station (Nagoya) – (植田駅) in Nagoya, Aichi Prefecture
 Ueda Station (Fukushima) – (植田駅) in Fukushima Prefecture
 Ueda Station (Nagano) – (上田駅) in Nagano Prefecture